The Santa Marija Chapel is one of the Roman Catholic churches in Żabbar, Malta. This church is dedicated to the Assumption of Mary and is known by the title 'tal-indirizz' (guide towards eternal salvation) and is the only one having this title in Malta. This chapel is found in one of the oldest quarters of the town of Żabbar.

History
In 1585, Gaspare Testaferrata was doing his best to rebuild an old church which existed till then. By 1615, this work was finished and a new altarpiece representing Our Lady and St Leonard was already provided. Its feast was held on 8 September. Throughout the 17th century people from different parts of Malta used to visit this Marian shrine. Its altarpiece was adorned with various precious objects. During the French occupation of 1799, it served as a parish church because of the damage inflicted by cannonballs fired by French soldiers from the Cottonera Lines on to the Sanctuary of Our Lady of Grace. Popular devotion towards this church continued to prevail throughout the 18th century.

Present day
The present altarpiece shows the Assumption of Mary (transported into Heaven with her body and soul united). A good statue of Our Lady of Sorrows is also in this chapel. Nowadays not only Masses are celebrated here but catechetical instruction is also given. Recently marriages also started being celebrated in this chapel.

The chapel is listed on the National Inventory of the Cultural Property of the Maltese Islands.

See also

Culture of Malta
History of Malta
List of Churches in Malta
Religion in Malta

References

Roman Catholic chapels in Malta
Żabbar
National Inventory of the Cultural Property of the Maltese Islands
Limestone churches in Malta